

Television
1 January – The Seven Network introduces a new logo, the first one to not have the 7 inside a circle , which is still in use as of today.
7 January – American sitcom Everybody Loves Raymond airs on the Seven Network for the very last time. It would change broadcasts to Network Ten on 28 November.
10 January – Australian cooking show Fresh premieres on the Nine Network.
17 January – Australian soap opera Something in the Air premieres on ABC. It was the very first Australian television series to be filmed in widescreen.
31 January – American police procedural, legal, crime drama television series Law & Order: Special Victims Unit makes it debut on Network Ten.
31 January – Dragon Ball Z premieres on Network Ten as part of Cheez TV. Originally using the censored Ocean Productions dub before switching to the uncut Funimation dub.
1 February – Popstars becomes the first Australian reality talent show, earning massive ratings for the Seven Network, leading to Bardot, the end product of the show. It becomes the first Australian act to debut at the number 1 position with both its debut single and debut album.
3 February – Disaster strikes for the long running Australian children's TV series Play School as the ABC sacks its producer Henrietta Clark and long-time presenters Benita Collings, David James and Angela Moore in order to make way for a revamped version in the show’s 34-year history.
7 February – Author, journalist and former Four Corners presenter Paul Barry takes over as host of the Australian media analysis television program Media Watch presenting up until 6 November.
8 February – Australia's Funniest Home Video Show returns and starts in 2000 with a new look format, a new theme song and a relocation from Sydney to Melbourne. Also on that month, it moved to "Every Saturday Nights" at 6:30 PM.
21 February – The Nine Network's Australian game show Sale of the Century returns by rebranding their name to Sale of the New Century and celebrates 20 years on air.
22 February - The American police procedural series Third Watch premieres on the Nine Network.
26 February – The Nine Network debuts a brand new Saturday morning Warner Bros. themed wrapper program for children called The Cool Room as a replacement of its previous program What's Up Doc? which had been axed on Christmas Eve 1999.
27 February – The first ever reality TV show to debut in Australia, The Mole debuts on the Seven Network. Five more seasons follow.
6 March – Australian sports based talk show The Fat premieres on ABC.
12 March – The 1997 film Bean, starring British comedian Rowan Atkinson as his most famous character Mr. Bean and based on the British sitcom of the same name, premieres on the Seven Network.
13 March – In response to GTV-9's Burgo's Catch Phrase losing its ratings, the Seven Network's smash-hit puzzle show, Wheel of Fortune changes the new cash values on the Wheel. The changes including the rising of the top dollars, were from $500 to $750 in Round 1, $1000 to $1500 in Rounds 2 & 3 and $2000 to $2500 in Round 4. The Proton car Wedge is introduced on the wheel. The show's highest-rating 4000th Episode was screened on 13 June, then the Battle of the Champions special was screened in September, before it followed with the Sydney Olympics.
3 April – American children's television series Bear in the Big Blue House is broadcast on ABC airing on free for air television in Australia for the first time two years after its Australian debut on the Disney Channel.
24 April – Australian comedy series Pizza makes its premiere on SBS.
24 April – Jan Moody wins the first season of The Mole, taking home $115,000 in prize money. Alan Mason is revealed as the Mole, and Abby Coleman is the runner-up.
1 May – Digimon makes it debut on Network Ten.
7 May – The 1996 film The Frighteners starring Michael J. Fox premieres on Network Ten.
20 May – Australian-American science fiction television series Farscape premieres on the Nine Network airing for the first time in Australia after the previous year when it first aired on The Sci-Fi Channel in the United States. The series was produced by The Jim Henson Company and Hallmark Entertainment.
27 May – Network Ten broadcasts the final episode of the Australian satirical panel game show Good News Week.
8 June – Australian soap opera Home and Away airs on ITV in the UK for the very last time after being broadcast on the network for 11 years. It will return to air on British television on Channel 5 on 16 July 2001. The show's year-long absence occurs because of a clause in ITV's contract preventing it from being broadcast for at least a year after its ITV run ends.
2 July – Batman & Robin premieres on the Nine Network.
16 July – The 1997 film Conspiracy Theory starring Mel Gibson and Julia Roberts premieres on the Nine Network.
18 July – Former Hey Hey It's Saturday team member/Red Faces gong master judge Red Symons, became the first celebrity to miss the $500,000 question on the three-hour celebrity special on Who Wants to Be a Millionaire?.
14 August – National Nine News updates its theme and on air graphics to coincide with the launch of Digital TV.
27 August – Australian drama series SeaChange returns for a third season on ABC.
28 August – Then 58-year-old Brisbane resident Trevor Sauer becomes the first person to win $500,000 on Who Wants to Be a Millionaire?.
15 September – The Sydney Olympics earn record ratings for Channel 7 with the Olympic Opening and Closing Ceremonies, and its continuous coverage.
18 September – Australian breakfast program Sunrise returns to the Seven Network after a very long absence since its final episode in 1999.
9 October – Rove McManus's weekly talk show Rove Live makes its debut on Network Ten after it was axed by the Nine Network in 1999.
15 October – The 1997 film The Peacemaker starring George Clooney and Nicole Kidman premieres on the Nine Network.
6 November – Australian media analysis television program Media Watch is axed by the ABC as the host of the program Paul Barry had been sacked by the network's managing director Jonathan Shier.
18 November – The 1997 slasher film Scream 2, the sequel to the 1996 film Scream, premieres on the Nine Network.
28 November – American sitcom Everybody Loves Raymond switches over to air on Network Ten.
2 December – The 1997 film Spice World starring British pop group the Spice Girls premieres on the Seven Network.
9 December – Final episode of the Australian drama series SeaChange is broadcast on the ABC.
27 December – Long running Australian soap opera Neighbours begins airing on television stations in Ireland for the very first time on RTÉ.
The famous Touched by Berlei Hands TV commercial depicting a young woman with long dark hair, shown in the lead up to the Sydney Olympics, goes to air for the very first time.
TV stations conduct test transmissions in digital.

Channels

New channels
 1 January – CNNfn
 2 December – FOX Classics Shared with Fox Kids

Debuts

Free-to-air

Domestic

International

Subscription Television

Domestic

International

Specials

Documentary Specials

Changes to network affiliation
This is a list of programs which made their premiere on an Australian television network that had previously premiered on another Australian television network. The networks involved in the switch of allegiances are predominantly both free-to-air networks or both subscription television networks. Programs that have their free-to-air/subscription television premiere, after previously premiering on the opposite platform (free-to air to subscription/subscription to free-to air) are not included. In some cases, programs may still air on the original television network. This occurs predominantly with programs shared between subscription television networks.

International

Programming Changes

Subscription premieres
This is a list of programs which made their premiere on Australian subscription television that had previously premiered on Australian free-to-air television. Programs may still air on the original free-to-air television network.

Domestic

International

Ending This Year

Returning this year
 18 September – Sunrise (Seven Network)

See also 
 2000 in Australia
 List of Australian films of 2000

References